Matisia exalata is a species of flowering plant in the family Malvaceae sensu lato or Bombacaceae. It is found only in Panama. It is threatened by habitat loss.

References

exalata
Endemic flora of Panama
Endangered plants
Endangered flora of North America
Taxonomy articles created by Polbot